Childwold is a hamlet in St. Lawrence County, New York, United States. Childwold has a post office with ZIP code 12922.

References

Hamlets in St. Lawrence County, New York
Hamlets in New York (state)